The Lumières Award for Best Screenplay  is an annual award presented by the Académie des Lumières since 1996.

Winners and nominees
Winners for Best Original or Adapted Screenplay are listed first with a blue background, followed by the other nominees.

1990s

2000s

2010s

See also
César Award for Best Adaptation
César Award for Best Original Screenplay
César Award for Best Writing

External links 
 Lumières Award for Best Screenplay at AlloCiné

References 

Screenplay
Screenwriting awards for film